Kelch repeat and BTB domain-containing protein 7 is a protein that in humans is encoded by the KBTBD7 gene.

References

Further reading

Kelch proteins